Syncopacma biareatella is a moth of the family Gelechiidae. It was described by Nikolay Grigoryevich Erschoff in 1874. It is found in Kyzylkum Desert in Central Asia.

References

Moths described in 1874
Syncopacma